Out of This World is  an album by jazz group The Three Sounds featuring performances recorded in 1962 and released on the Blue Note label.

Reception
The Allmusic review by Stephen Thomas Erlewine awarded the album 4 stars stating "Out of This World relies less on originals than before, concentrating on standards which sound startlingly fresh. It's the loose, flexible groove that's the key... It's hard to sound this light and easy, and the Three Sounds pull it off with grace".

Track listing
All compositions by Gene Harris except as indicated
 "Girl of My Dreams" (Sunny Clapp)- 3:00
 "Out of the Past" - 6:30 (Benny Golson)
 "Just in Time" (Betty Comden, Adolph Green, Jule Styne) - 6:15
 "I'll Be Around" (Alec Wilder) - 3:40
 "My Silent Love" (Edward Heyman, Dana Suesse) - 7:00
 "Sanctified Sue" - 3:35
 "Out of This World" (Harold Arlen, Johnny Mercer) - 6:30
 "You Make Me Feel So Young" (Mack Gordon, Josef Myrow) - 4:20
 "Over the Rainbow" (Harold Arlen, Yip Harburg) - 4:51 Bonus track on CD reissue
 "I'll Be Around" [Long Version] (Wilder) - 7:02 Bonus track on CD reissue
Recorded at Rudy Van Gelder Studio, Englewood Cliffs, New Jersey on February 4 (tracks 1, 3 & 7), March 7 (tracks 4 & 8-10),  and March 8 (tracks 2, 5 & 6), 1962

Personnel
Gene Harris - piano
Andrew Simpkins - bass
Bill Dowdy - drums

References

Blue Note Records albums
The Three Sounds albums
1966 albums
Albums produced by Alfred Lion
Albums recorded at Van Gelder Studio